Siyovush Mukhtorovich Asrorov ((), born 21 July 1992) is a Tajik footballer who plays for Istiklol in the Tajikistan Higher League and the Tajikistan national football team.

Career

Club
On 16 January 2019, Asrorov signed for Malaysia Super League club, PKNP FC.

On 1 November 2019, Asrorov signed for Rahmatganj MFS in Bangladesh Football Premier League.

On 8 December 2020, Asrorov signed for Sheikh Russel KC in Bangladesh Football Premier League.

On 24 December 2020, Asrorov scores his 1st goal for Sheikh Russel KC in 2020–21 Bangladesh Federation Cup.

On 3 August 2022, Istiklol announced the return of Asrorov after three-years away.

Career statistics

Club

International

Statistics accurate as of match played 22 September 2022

Honors
Istiklol
 Tajikistan Higher League (5): 2014, 2015,2016, 2017, 2022

 Tajikistan Cup (5): 2013, 2014, 2015, 2016, 2022
 Tajik Supercup (4): 2014, 2015, 2016, 2018

Tajikistan
King's Cup: 2022

References

External links 
 

1992 births
Living people
Tajikistani footballers
Tajikistan international footballers
FK Khujand players
FC Istiklol players
Footballers at the 2014 Asian Games
Association football defenders
Asian Games competitors for Tajikistan
PKNP FC players
Malaysia Super League players
Rahmatganj MFS players
Sheikh Russel KC players
Bangladesh Football Premier League players